Dorsetochelys is an extinct genus of turtle from the Early Cretaceous of southern England and northwestern Germany.

Taxonomy
The type species, Dorsetochelys delairi, was described on the basis of DORCM G.23, a complete skull from the Early Cretaceous (Berriasian) Purbeck Group of Dorset, England. Later, a turtle skull from the vicinity of Como Bluff, Wyoming, was described as a new species, D. buzzops, in honor of Buzz Pitman, a museum director of the Rock River Museum near Como Bluff. However, a cladistic analysis conducted in 2013 recovered that species as a member of Baenidae, sister to Uluops.

In 2012, pleurosternid remains were described from the Early Cretaceous (Berriasian) Bückeberg Formation of Lower Saxony, northwestern Germany, and this prompted a re-assessment of the problematic species "Pleurosternon" typocardium, which had been tentatively referred to Glyptops by Milner (2004). The new genus Ballerstedtia was coined for "P." typocardium, and the remains from Lower Saxony were named B. bueckergensis. In a paper published in 2014, Ballerstedtia was synonymized with Dorsetochelys.

References

Pleurosternidae
Prehistoric turtle genera
Late Jurassic turtles
Early Cretaceous turtles
Late Jurassic reptiles of Europe
Early Cretaceous reptiles of Europe
Fossil taxa described in 1976